Began Jarwar is a large village on the road from Tando Allahjyar to Mirwah Town. It is fertile with green lands and thickly populated area. It is about two hundred years old. It is also the Headquarter of Union Council Began Jarwar since 1959.  Population of Began Jarwar village is more than 3,000, and population of UC is about 20,000. The village has many basic facilities as dispensary, schools, veterinary centre for animals, agriculture office etc.

In village majority of people belongs to Jarwar community but there are also other communities such as Rind, Lohar (Samoon), Bheel, Kolhi, Sheedi, Umrani, and Shikari. There is an OGDCL oil field. It is part of Chamber Taluka situated 25 kilometers from Chamber Town in north and 12 kilometers south of the city of Tando Allahyar. at 25°25'35N 68°50'20E.

See also
 Ramapir Temple Tando Allahyar

References

 Union councils of Tando Allahyar District
 Populated places in Tando Allahyar District
Union councils of Sindh